Delphacinae is a subfamily of delphacid planthoppers in the family Delphacidae. There are at least 1,700 described species in Delphacinae.

Tribes
The following are included in BioLib.cz:

Delphacini
Auth. Leach, 1815; Selected genera:
 Aloha Kirkaldy, 1904
 Delphax Fabricius, 1798
 Nilaparvata Distant, 1906
 Perkinsiella Kirkaldy, 1903
 Sogatella Fennah, 1956

Saccharosydnini
Auth. Vilbaste, 1968
 Lacertina Remes Lenicov & Rossi Batiz, 2011
 Lacertinella Rossi Batiz & Remes Lenicov, 2012
 Neomalaxa Muir, 1918
 Pseudomacrocorupha Muir, 1930
 Saccharosydne Kirkaldy, 1907

Tropidocephalini
Auth. Muir, 1915

 Arcifrons Ding & Yang, 1986
 Arcofaciella Fennah, 1956
 Arcofacies Muir, 1915
 Bambucibatus Muir, 1915
 Bambusiphaga Huang & Ding, 1979
 Belocera Muir, 1913
 Carinodelphax Ding & Yang, 1987
 Carinofrons Chen & Li, 2000
 Columbiana Muir, 1919
 Columbisoga Muir, 1921
 Conocraera Muir, 1916
 Epeurysa Matsumura, 1900
 Gufacies Ding, 2006
 Haerinella Fennah, 1965
 Holzfussella Schmidt, 1926
 Jassidaeus Fieber, 1866
 Lamaxa Bartlett & Kennedy, 2018
 Lanaphora Muir, 1915
 Lauriana Ren & Qin, 2014
 Macrocorupha Muir, 1926
 Malaxa Melichar, 1914
 Malaxella Ding & Hu, 1986
 Mirocauda Chen, 2003
 Mucillnata Qin & Zhang, 2010
 Neobelocera J.H. Ding & L.F. Yang, 1986
 Neocarinodelphax Chen & Tsai, 2009
 Orchesma Melichar, 1903
 Platyeurysa Fennah, 1988
 Procidelphax Bartlett, 2010
 Pseudembolophora Muir, 1920
 Pundaluoya Kirkaldy, 1903
 Purohita Distant, 1906
 Smaroides Fennah, 1988
 Sogatopsis Muir, 1913
 Specinervures Kuoh & Ding, 1980
 Tropidocephala Stål, 1853
 Xalama Bartlett & Kennedy, 2018
 Yuanchia Chen & Tsai, 2009

References

 Asche, M. (1985). "Zur Phylogenie der Delphacidae Leach, 1815 (Homoptera: Cicadina: Fulgoromorpha)". Marburger Entomologische Publikationen, vol. 2, no. 1, 1-910.
 Emeljanov, A. F. (1996). "On the question of the classification and phylogeny of the Delphacidae (Homoptera, Cicadina), with reference to larval characters". Entomological Review, vol. 75, no. 9, 134-150.
 Urban, Julie M., Charles R. Bartlett, and Jason R. Cryan (2010). "Evolution of Delphacidae (Hemiptera: Fulgoroidea): combined-evidence phylogenetics reveals importance of grass host shifts". Systematic Entomology, vol. 35, no. 4, 678-691.
 Wagner, Wilhelm (1962). "Dynamische Taxionomie, angewandt auf die Delphaciden Mitteleuropas". Mitteilungen aus dem Hamburgischen Zoologischen Museum und Institut, vol. 60, 111-180.

Further information

 List of Delphacinae genera (many in this subfamily)

External links

 NCBI Taxonomy Browser, Delphacinae

 
Delphacidae